The 34th Artistic Gymnastics World Championships were held at Tianjin Arena in Tianjin, China in 1999.

Results
**The Ukrainian Women's Gymnastics Team was awarded the bronze in 2011 after China was disqualified due to Dong Fongxiao being underage at the time of competing.

Medal table

Overall

Men

Women

Men

Team Final

All-around

Floor Exercise

Pommel Horse

Rings

Vault

Parallel Bars

Horizontal Bar

Women

Team

 China originally finished third, but it was discovered in 2008 that Chinese officials falsified the age of team member Dong Fangxiao; the team were officially disqualified in March 2012, with the bronze medals awarded to Ukraine, and Dong's results from this competition and the 2000 Olympics were struck from the records. Previously, in 2010, China's 2000 Olympic bronze medals had been awarded to the US team.

All Around Final

Vault Final

Uneven Bars

Balance Beam

Floor Exercise

References

World Artistic Gymnastics Championships
International gymnastics competitions hosted by China
G
W